Alessandro Zanellati (born 23 September 1999) is an Italian football player. He plays for  club Padova.

Club career

Torino
He was raised in the Torino youth teams and started playing for their Under-19 squad in the 2017–18 season. He has not been called up to the senior squad.

Loan to Rezzato
For 2018–19 season, he joined Serie D club AC Rezzato on loan.

Loan to Gubbio
In July 2019 he joined Gubbio in Serie C on loan.

He made his professional Serie C debut for Gubbio on 1 September 2019 in a game against Virtus Verona.

Giana Erminio
On 10 September 2020 he signed a 2-year contract with Giana Erminio.

Padova
On 6 July 2022, Zanelatti moved to Padova.

References

External links
 

1999 births
People from Moncalieri
Footballers from Piedmont
Living people
Italian footballers
Association football goalkeepers
Torino F.C. players
A.S. Gubbio 1910 players
A.S. Giana Erminio players
Calcio Padova players
Serie C players
Serie D players
Sportspeople from the Metropolitan City of Turin